Joseph Servières (20 July 1781 – 3 February 1826) was an early 19th-century French playwright.

Biography 
Servieres made good studies in his hometown and came very young to Paris, where upon his arrival he gave several theatre plays which had some success. He was noticed by Lucien Bonaparte, then interior minister, but soon fell into Napoleon's disfavor. In 1807, he married Eugénie Charen, the stepdaughter of the painter Lethière, who was herself a distinguished artist. He then accompanied to Italy his stepfather who had been appointed director of the French School in Rome, where he met Lucien, a longtime friend and confidant of Lethière.

Servières returned to Paris in 1812 and obtained a position in the public treasury. Under the Restoration, 
he was appointed a public auditor at the Court of Audit on 8 September 1818. He kept on writing plays until his death.

Works 
1800: Les dieux à Tivoli, ou l’Ascension de l’Olympe, folie non-fastueuse, arlequinade-impromptu in 1 act and comédie en vaudevilles, Paris, in-8°, with Étienne, Morel and Francis baron d'Allarde
1801: Le Bouquet de pensées pour l’an X, in-8° 
1801: La Martingale, ou le Serret de gagner au jeu, arlequinade-vaudeville in 1 act, in prose, Paris, in-8°, with Francis and Belargey 
1801: Le Père malgré lui, comédie-vaudeville in 1 act and in prose, with R. Philidor [Rochelle] 
1801: Le Télégraphe d’amour, comedy in 1 act, in prose, mingled with vaudevilles, with Charles Henrion 
1801: Rembrandt, ou la Vente après décès, one-act vaudeville anecdotique, with Étienne, Morel and Moras 
1802:Fontenelle, one-act comédie-anecdote, in prose and vaudevilles, with Petit ainé 
1803: Monsieur Botte, ou le Négociant anglais, comedy in 3 acts and in prose, imitated from the novel by Pigault-Lebrun, with Ernest de Clonard and François Grille 
1803: Manon la ravaudeuse, one-act vaudeville, mingled with vaudevilles, with Désaugiers and Charles Henrion 
1803: Fanchon la vielleuse de retour dans ses montagnes, three-act comedy, mingled with vaudevilles, with Joseph Aude 
1804: Les Charbonniers de la Forêt noire, three-act comedy, mingled with vaudevilles, with Sewrin and Lafortelle 
1803: Drelindindin, ou le carillonneur de la Samaritaine, one-act parade, mingled with vaudevilles ; premiered at Théâtre de la Cité-Variétés, 23 brumaire an 11, with Charles Henrion 
1803: Jean Bart, one-act historical comedy, in prose and vaudevilles, with Duval and Ligier ;
1804: Un quart d’heure d’un sage, one-act vaudeville, with F.-P.-A. Léger ;
1804: Jocrisse suicidé, tragicomic drama in 1 act and in prose, with Sidoni ;
1804: Brisquet et Jolicœur, one-act vaudeville, with Dumaniant ;
1804: Bombarde, ou les Marchands de chansons, parody of Ossian, ou les Bardes, mélodrame lyrique in 5 acts, with Daudet and Léger ;
1804: La Belle Milanaise, ou la Fille femme, page et soldat, three-act melodrama, extravaganza, with Charles Henrion ;
1804: Le Dansomane de la rue Quincampoix, ou le Bal interrompu, one-act folie-vaudeville, with Moreau ;
1805: Jeanneton colère, one-act vaudeville grivois, with G. Duval ;
1805: Les Nouvelles Métamorphoses, one-act vaudeville, with Antoine-Marie Coupart  ;
1806: Alphonsine, ou la Tendresse maternelle, melodrama in 3 acts and in prose, from the novel by Félicité de Genlis, with Dumersan ;
1806: Madame Scarron, one-act comédie-vaudeville, with Désaugiers
1807: Monsieur Giraffe, ou la Mort de l’ours blanc, one-act vaudeville, par M. Bernard, de la rue aux Ours, with Dumersan, Desaugiers and five other collaborators ;
1807: Arlequin double, one-act vaudeville, with Desaugiers ;
1809: La pièce qui n’en est pas une, dialogue analogue aux prologues et épilogues, with Georges Duval and Bonnel ;
1804: Toujours le même, one-act vaudeville, Paris, Théâtre Montansier, 12 fructidor an XII, with Antoine-Marie Coupart ;
1826: Chansons nouvelles, Paris, chez les Principaux Libraires, in-8°.

Two other plays are attributed to Servières: l’Amant comédien and Les trois n’en font qu’un, as well as an essay entitled Revue des théâtres. Several songs from his comedies have been inserted in the Chansonnier français and other lyrical collections.

Sources 
 .

References

External links 
 Joseph Servières on Data.bnf.fr

19th-century French dramatists and playwrights
1781 births
1826 deaths